Alan Carr (born 21 April 1939) is a former Australian rules footballer who played for the North Melbourne Football Club in the Victorian Football League (VFL).		
While captain-coach of Frankston in the 1968 VFA season, Carr had to have an eye removed, due to an injury sustained in a game against Box Hill.

Notes

External links 
		

Living people
1939 births
Australian rules footballers from Victoria (Australia)
North Melbourne Football Club players